Qullqa Punta (Quechua qullqa, qulqa deposit, storehouse, punta peak; ridge; first, before, in front of, "deposit peak", also spelled Julca Punta) is a   mountain in the Andes of Peru. It is located in the Huánuco Region, Yarowilca Province, Aparicio Pomares District.

References

Mountains of Peru
Mountains of Huánuco Region